The Miller House is a historic house on a former plantation in Elba, Tennessee, U.S.. It was built in 1840 for William Miller. It was designed in the Federal architectural style, with a Greek Revival porch. It has been listed on the National Register of Historic Places since December 8, 1978.

References

National Register of Historic Places in Fayette County, Tennessee
Federal architecture in Tennessee
Greek Revival architecture in Tennessee
Houses completed in 1840
Plantation houses in Tennessee